Valentine Pavlovich Vishnevsky (born June 8, 1958) is a Ukrainian economist., Fellow of the National Academy of Sciences of Ukraine (2012) and professor of economics (2005). The area of his scientific interests includes economic theory, modelling of economic systems, fiscal, monetary and industrial policy.

Biography 
Vishnevsky was born in 1958 in Sumy in Ukraine. In 1980,  he graduated with honours from the Kharkov Engineering and Economic Institute (qualification — engineer-economist). Since 1980 he has been an employee of the Institute of Industrial Economics of National Academy of Sciences (NAS) of Ukraine. In 1987 he defended his PhD thesis on "Economic methods of using reserves to accelerate the technical re-equipment of production (case study on metallurgical enterprises of the Ukrainian SSR)", and in 1998 he defended his doctoral thesis on "Methodological bases of improving the taxation of enterprises".

Since 1997, Vishnevsky  has been the head of a number of researches and scientific projects of the NAS of Ukraine. Among the most important ones is the scientific and technical project on creation of "The Intellectual automated system of budget process support" (2007–2013)”, which is a unique complex of system-dynamic mathematical models, databases and information technologies that allow quantitatively estimate the consequences of decisions made by authorities in the sphere of fiscal policy for the economy of individual regions and the state as a whole.

Vishnevsky is the Editor-in-Chief of the journal Economy of Industry. He is also a member of the editorial boards of the journals Science and Innovations and Economy of Ukraine.

Publications 
Based on the research findings more than 100 scientific works were published, including four personal monographs and a number of scientific monographs in co-authorship, papers in well-known Ukrainian, Russian and English-language journals (Economy of Ukraine, Voprosy Ekonomiki, World Economy and International Relations, Terra Economicus, Journal of Tax Reform, Environment, Development and Sustainability, etc.).

Selected papers

Selected monographs 
 
 
 Supranational Models of Tax Systems: from China to the Maghreb (Chinese-East Asian, Indian-South Asian, and Maghreb-middle Eastern tax populations) : monograph / V. P. Vishnevsky, L.I. Goncharenko, A.V. Gurnak, E.N. Vishnevskaya; Edited by professor V. P. Vishnevsky. M.: Magistr: INFRA-M, 2017. 272 pp.  (в пер.) Publication Language: Russian.
 Taxation: Theories, Problems, Solutions / V. P. Vishnevsky, A.S. Vetkin, E.N. Vishnevskaya etc.; Edited by V. P. Vishnevsky. – Donetsk: DonNTU, IEP NAS of Ukraine, 2006. – 504 pp. . Publication Language: Russian.

Awards and prizes 
 1991 — a medal of the NAS of Ukraine with a prize for young scientists (for series of works "Theoretical foundations and methodological support for the formation of an effective mechanism of profit distribution")
 2019 – the winner of the award named after M. I. Tugan-Baranovsky for outstanding scientific work in the field of economics (for series of works "Prospects, directions and mechanisms of development of the smart industry in Ukraine")

Bibliography 
 Personal page on site of the NAS of Ukraine
 50-річчя члена-кореспондента НАН України Валентина Павловича Вишневського
 eLIBRARY.RU — Вишневский Валентин Павлович — Анализ публикационной активности
 http://ojs.econindustry.org/index.php/ep

References

External links
 Валентин Вишневский — Google Scholar Citations

1958 births
Living people
People from Sumy
20th-century Ukrainian economists
21st-century Ukrainian economists